State Route 307 (SR 307) is a south-north state highway located in the east central part of the U.S. state of Georgia. The route runs entirely within the Savannah metropolitan area and Chatham County.

Route description
SR 307 begins at an intersection with US 17/SR 25 in Garden City. The route heads northwest along Dean Forest Road, before making a sharp turn to the northeast to its interchange with Interstate 16. It heads on a more northeastern direction before it curves to the northwest, and then to the north. Before skirting the southeastern part of the Savannah/Hilton Head International Airport, it intersects US 80/SR 26, and then curves to the northeast along Bourne Avenue. Heading due east, SR 307 intersects SR 21 (Augusta Road). Here, it begins a concurrency with SR 21 Alternate (SR 21 Alt.). The roadway curves to the southeast, where SR 21 Alt. splits off, and makes a northeasterly jaunt until it meets its northern terminus, an intersection with SR 25 (Ocean Highway) just north of Garden City.

Major intersections

See also

References

External links

307
Transportation in Chatham County, Georgia